The Grand Hyatt Shanghai is a hotel located in the Pudong area of Shanghai. It is operated by the Hyatt Hotels Corporation, based in Chicago.

The 548-room hotel occupies the 53rd to 87th floors of the 88-story Jin Mao Tower. The hotel was the highest hotel in the world with the hotel lobby located on the 54th floor until the Park Hyatt opened in the neighbouring Shanghai World Financial Center. The hotel features a 33-story atrium.

Features
The hotel offers views of The Bund, a stretch of restored historical buildings, along the Huangpu River.  18 different room styles are offered.

The Hyatt's barrel-vaulted atrium starts at the 56th floor and extends upwards to the 87th. Lined with 28 annular corridors and staircases arrayed in a spiral, it is 27 m in diameter with a clear height of approximately 115 m.

References

External links 
 

Hotels in Shanghai
Hyatt Hotels and Resorts